David A. "Dave" Vella is a Democratic member of the Illinois House of Representatives from the 68th district since January 13, 2021. The 68th district covers parts of Cherry Valley, Loves Park, Machesney Park, Rockford, and Roscoe.

He was first elected to the state House after defeating Republican incumbent John Cabello in the 2020 Illinois House of Representatives election.

Early life, education, and career
Vella is a "lifelong resident of Rockford." He graduated from Boylan Catholic High School. He graduated with a BA from Augustana College and in 1997 a JD from Northern Illinois University. He previously worked as a public defender in Winnebago County. Since 2000, he has been an associate of his family's law firm Vella & Lund, P.C. He is a former member of the Rockford Literacy Council and a former board president of Keith Country Day School.

As of July 3, 2022, Representative Vella is a member of the following Illinois House committees:

 Appropriations - Public Safety Committee (HAPP)
 Child Care Access & Early Childhood Education Committee (HCEC)
 Elementary & Secondary Education: School Curriculum & Policies Committee (HELM)
 Judiciary - Criminal Committee (HJUC)
 Law Enforcement Subcommittee (SHPF-LAWE)
 Police & Fire Committee (SHPF)
 Public Utilities Committee (HPUB)
 Small Cell Subcommittee (HPUB-SCEL)
 Veterans' Affairs Committee (HVET)

Electoral history

Personal life
Vella and his wife, Michelle, have a daughter and son, Grace and Ryan, respectively. His family are members of St. Anthony's Church. His grandfather was Edolo J. "Zeke" Giorgi, who was a former long-time Illinois state Representative in the Rockford area.

External links
Representative Dave Vella (D) at the Illinois General Assembly website
Constituent website
Illinois House Democratic Caucus

References

21st-century American politicians
Augustana College (Illinois) alumni
Illinois lawyers
Living people
Democratic Party members of the Illinois House of Representatives
Northern Illinois University alumni
People from Rockford, Illinois
Year of birth missing (living people)
Public defenders